is a passenger railway station  located in the city of  Takarazuka Hyōgo Prefecture, Japan. It is operated by the private transportation company Hankyu Railway.

Lines

Layout
The station consists of two opposed side platforms, connected by an underground passage, with the  ticket gate also located underground, because the station is located at the foot of a mountain. In the square on the north side of the station, there is an underground bicycle parking lot and a bus and taxi stand.

Platforms

Adjacent stations

History
Yamamoto station opened on March 10, 1910, the day the Takarazuka Line started operation. Hirai Station opened October 23 the same year. On September 1, 1944, two stations were merged to a new station facility under the station name Yamamoto. 

The name Hirai was however retained as a secondary name in response to the local community's request and the running in boards of the station also reads  in parentheses and in small letters next to the official name Yamamoto.

Passenger statistics
In fiscal 2019, the station was used by an average of 19,285 passengers daily

Surrounding area
Aiai Park  (about 5 minutes on foot)
 Itami City Aramaki Rose Park (about 20 minutes on foot)

See also
List of railway stations in Japan

References

External links

Yamamoto Station (Hankyu Railway) 

Railway stations in Hyōgo Prefecture
Hankyu Railway Takarazuka Line
Stations of Hankyu Railway
Railway stations in Japan opened in 1910
Takarazuka, Hyōgo